Mauritian Premier League is the top division of football in Mauritius, governed by the Mauritius Football Association since its establishment in 1935.

Premier League – 2021–22 Clubs
 FC DODO
 AS Port-Louis 2000
 AS Vacoas-Phoenix
 Bolton City Youth Club
 Cercle de Joachim
 Entente Boulet Rouge
 GRSE Wanderers
 La Cure Sylvester
 Pamplemousses
 Petite Rivière Noire

Stadiums

Current stadiums

Previous winners

1935 : Curepipe SC
1936 : Garrison
1937 : Garrison
1938 : FC Dodo (Curepipe)
1939 : FC Dodo (Curepipe)
1940 : no championship
1941 : no championship
1942 : Fire Brigade SC (Beau Bassin-Rose Hill)
1943 : no championship
1944 : FC Dodo (Curepipe)
1945 : FC Dodo (Curepipe)
1946 : FC Dodo (Curepipe)
1947 : Collège du Saint-Esprit
1948 : FC Dodo (Curepipe)
1949 : Faucon Flacq
1950 : Fire Brigade SC (Beau Bassin-Rose Hill)
1951 : FC Dodo (Curepipe)
1952 : no championship
1953 : FC Dodo (Curepipe)
1954 : Faucon Flacq
1955 : Faucon Flacq
1956 : no championship
1957 : FC Dodo (Curepipe) & Faucon Flacq (double)
1958 : Faucon Flacq
1959 : FC Dodo (Curepipe)
1960 : no championship
1961 : Fire Brigade SC (Beau Bassin-Rose Hill)
1962 : Police Club (Port Louis)
1963 : Racing Club (Quatre Bornes)
1964 : FC Dodo (Curepipe)
1965 : Police Club (Port Louis)
1966 : FC Dodo (Curepipe)
1967 : Police Club (Port Louis)
1968 : FC Dodo (Curepipe)
1969 : no championship
1970 : no championship
1971 : Police Club (Port Louis)
1972 : Police Club (Port Louis)
1973 : Fire Brigade SC (Beau Bassin-Rose Hill)
1974 : Fire Brigade SC (Beau Bassin-Rose Hill)
1975 : Hindu Cadets (Quatre Bornes)
1976 : Muslim Scouts Club (Port Louis)
1976–77 : Hindu Cadets (Quatre Bornes)
1977–78 : Racing Club (Quatre Bornes))
1978–79 : Hindu Cadets (Quatre Bornes)
1979–80 : Fire Brigade SC (Beau Bassin-Rose Hill)
1980–81 : Police Club (Port Louis)
1981–82 : Police Club (Port Louis)
1982–83 : Fire Brigade SC (Beau Bassin-Rose Hill)
1983–84 : Fire Brigade SC (Beau Bassin-Rose Hill)
1984–85 : Fire Brigade SC (Beau Bassin-Rose Hill)
1985–86 : Cadets Club (Quatre Bornes)
1986–87 : Sunrise (Flacq)
1987–88 : Fire Brigade SC (Beau Bassin-Rose Hill)
1988–89 : Sunrise (Flacq)
1989–90 : Sunrise (Flacq)
1990–91 : Sunrise (Flacq)
1991–92 : Sunrise (Flacq)
1992–93 : Fire Brigade SC (Beau Bassin-Rose Hill)
1993–94 : Fire Brigade SC (Beau Bassin-Rose Hill)
1994–95 : Sunrise (Flacq)
1995–96 : Sunrise (Flacq)
1996–97 : Sunrise (Flacq)
1997–98 : Scouts Club (Port Louis)
1998–99 : Fire Brigade SC (Beau Bassin-Rose Hill)
2000 : no championship
2000–01 : Olympique de Moka
2002 : AS Port-Louis 2000
2003 : AS Port-Louis 2000
2003–04 : AS Port-Louis 2000
2004–05 : AS Port-Louis 2000
2005–06 : Pamplemousses SC
2006–07 : Curepipe Starlight SC
2007–08 : Curepipe Starlight SC
2008–09 : Curepipe Starlight SC
2010 : Pamplemousses SC
2011 : AS Port-Louis 2000
2011–12 : Pamplemousses SC
2012–13 : Curepipe Starlight SC
2013–14 : Cercle de Joachim SC
2014–15 : Cercle de Joachim SC
2015–16 : AS Port-Louis 2000
2016–17 : Pamplemousses SC
2017–18 : Pamplemousses SC
2018–19 : Pamplemousses SC
2019–20 : abandoned due to Covid-19
2020–21 : abandoned due to Covid-19
2021–22 : abandoned due to Covid-19

Performance by club

Top scorers

See also
List of football clubs in Mauritius

External links
Football for the Peoples. Mauritius
FIFA
OLEOLE
Mauritian League Competition History

 
1
Mauritius